Buchema primula is a species of sea snail, a marine gastropod mollusk in the family Horaiclavidae.

Description
The length of the shell attains 6 mm.
(Original description) The small, compact shell has a gradately fusiform shape. It contains 8 whorls, of which the uppermost two are nuclear, smooth, white, globular. The remainderare  plicately ridged spirally at the sutures, and, below these, angularly sloping and closely longitudinally ribbed. The ribs are crossed, as regards the upper whorls, by two, the body whorl by four or five spiral incrassate revolving lines. These are gemmulate, white, and shining at the points of junction with the ribs. The interstices are oblong. The shell has a pale primrose hue, very delicate in colour. The aperture is small and oval. The outer lip is slightly angled centrally and thickened. The columellar margin is almost straight. The sinus is very obscure. The siphonal canal is abbreviate.

Distribution
This marine species occurs in the Caribbean Sea off Cuba.

References

External links
  Tucker, J.K. 2004 Catalog of recent and fossil turrids (Mollusca: Gastropoda). Zootaxa 682:1-1295.
 Specimen at MNHN, Paris
 Fallon, Phillip J , Descriptions and illustrations of some new and poorly known turrids of the tropical northwestern Atlantic. Part 1. Genera Buchema Corea, 1934 and Miraclathurella Woodring, 1928 (Gastropoda: Turridae: Crassispirinae); Nautilus 124, 2010

primula
Gastropods described in 1923